Pax Corpus is a 1997 cyberpunk action and adventure video game developed and published by the French studio Cryo Interactive. It was released only in Europe for Windows PC and for the PlayStation console.

Plot 
The game takes place in a cyberpunk sci-fi universe where the population is entirely made up of women; the men have all been killed, and the few survivors are mindless slaves. The reproduction of the population is ensured by the cloning technology of a powerful corporation, Alcyon, led by Kiyiana Soro. The player embodies a mercenary, Kahlee, who works for her own account. Kahlee comes to gradually unveil a dangerous project called Pax Corpus. Pax Corpus was created by Dr. Ellys on behalf of Kiyiana Soro. It is a terrible weapon which emits a radiation capable of taking away all freedom of thought from anyone exposed to it for too long; the people who are exposed to it are integrated into a collective entity subject to Alcyon. Kahlee must foil this plot, while maintaining a love-hate relationship with Kiyiana Soro.

Gameplay 
Pax Corpus is a third person action game, but includes an option to temporarily switch to first person vision. The player directs their character in a 3D environment, and must eliminate various enemies using several weapons. As the game progresses, the player levels up by finding flashcards that gain proficiency in new weapons.

Development
The Pax Corpus project was originally meant to adapt the MTV American animated series Æon Flux, commissioned from Cryo Interactive by Viacom New Media. A first version of the game was shown at the E3 convention in 1996, with the scenario inspired by the episode of the series entitled "The Demiurge". According to a page in GameSpot's "Video Game Graveyard," the project's abandonment occurred when Spelling Entertainment, having taken control of Viacom, merged Viacom with Virgin Interactive and canceled all ongoing projects at Viacom. With the game already in late development, Cryo changed the names of the characters and certain details of the universe to remove the copyrighted elements of Æon Flux, then published the game under the title Pax Corpus.

Release and Reception
Pax Corpus was released in the United Kingdom in October 1997 and sold in various retailers and mail-order shops for £33.99. Even after release of the Game, many in Europe still expected Aeon Flux to be released, not realising Pax Corpus was based on it.

The official UK PlayStation Magazine gave it a 2/10 in its final issue calling it "Tomb Raider in Space, but Crap"

Issue 35, August 1998 of UK Magazine PlayStation Plus gave the game 30% critiquing the graphics and lack of gameplay "No rational human can want games like this to exist. The controls are way bollocks, the combat's shite, the whole game's piss-ugly. A big fat waste of time."

The September 1998 issue of Extreme PlayStation Magazine gave Pax Corpus a 19% score with the author stating "I’m going to be brutally honest and say this game is the worst to ever be released on the PlayStation in its entire history" giving a score of 3 for Graphics, 6 for Sound, 2 for Gameplay and 3 for Lifespan.

Polish Video Game Magazine Gry Komputerowe gave the video game 35% in its October 1998 issue.

German Video Game Magazine Maniac gave Pax Corpus a slightly more positive score of 39% in its May 1998 issue.

French Magazine Console Plus gave a negative review and score of 21% in Issue 70.

Australian Magazine Hyper chose Pax Corpus as the Third Worst game (across all gaming platforms) of 1997–1998 in Issue 63.

References

External links 
 Consoles Plus review (French)
"Information and walkthrough of the game by Wade Clarke on the GameFAQs site in 2001"

1997 video games
Cyberpunk video games
Cryo Interactive games
Europe-exclusive video games
PlayStation (console) games
Video games developed in France
Windows games